Frank Pasche (born 19 March 1993) is a Swiss former professional racing cyclist. He rode at the 2015 UCI Track Cycling World Championships.

Major results
2018
 4th Overall Tour of Mevlana

References

External links
 

1993 births
Living people
Swiss male cyclists
Sportspeople from the canton of Fribourg
Olympic cyclists of Switzerland
Cyclists at the 2016 Summer Olympics